Diocese  of Armavir ( Armaviri t'em), is a diocese of the Armenian Apostolic Church covering the Armavir Province of Armenia. The name is derived from the historic city of Armavir which served as the capital of the ancient Kingdom of Armenia between 331 and 210 BC. 

The diocese was officially founded on May 30, 1996, by Catholicos Karekin I. The seat of the diocese is the Cathedral of Saint Gregory of Narek in the town of Armavir. Bishop Sion Adamyan is currently the primate of the diocese, serving since 2001.

History
Being home to many of the most important churches and monasteries of the Armenian Apostolic Church, the territory of Armavir has been the spiritual centre of the Armenian nation. Throughout the history, the territory has been regulated by several dioceses of the Armenian Church, including the diocese of Amberd, Hovhannavank and Bjni.

The territory remained an active religious centre of the Armenian church with the inauguration of many churches and monastic complexes during the medieval period. During the 7th century, the churches of Saint Hripsime, Saint Gayane, Zvartnots and Targmanchats were built.

After the independence of Armenia, the Diocese of Armavir was officially founded upon a kontakion issued by Catholicos Karekin I on May 30, 1996. The church of Holy Mother of God in Vagharshapat has served as the seat of the diocese until 2014, when it was moved to the newly built Saint Gregory of Narek Church in the town of Armavir.

Currently, the diocese has 26 churches under its jurisdiction, while the Etchmiadzin Cathedral and the churches of Hripsime, Gayane, Shoghakat, and the Holy Archangels are under the direct regulation of the Mother See.

Primates
Bishop Asoghik Aristakesyna 1996-1998
Priest Khoren Manukyan 1998-1999 (as vicar)
Priestmonk Arshen Sanosyan 1999 (as vicar)
Bishop Grigoris Buniatyan 1999-2001 (acting primate)
Priest Artak Simonyan 2001 (acting primate)
Bishop Sion Adamyan 2001-present

Active churches

Surp Harutyun Church, Geghakert, 13th century
Holy Mother of God Church, Vagharshapat, 1767
Surp Harutyun Church, Parakar, 1859
Saint Stephen Church, Doghs, 19th century
Holy Mother of God Church, Aygeshat (Vagharshapat), 19th century
Surp Hovahnnes Church, Argavand, 19th century, rebuilt in 2009
Saint George's Church, Aygeshat (Armavir), 1854
Holy Mother of God Church, Parakar, 1855 
Holy Mother of God Church, Artimed, 1876
Holy Mother of God Church, Sardarapat, 1882
Surp Nshan Church, Gai, 1894
Holy Mother of God Church, Mrgashat, 1903
Holy Mother of God Church, Arshaluys, 1909
Surp Hovahnnes Church, Mrgastan, 1912
Surp Sahak Church, Tandzut, 1912
Holy Mother of God Church, Bambakashat, 1914
Holy Saviour's Church, Musaler, 2000
Saint Lazarus Church, Metsamor, 2005
Surp Vartan Church, Baghramyan, 2009
Holy Mother of God Church, Shahumyan, 2010
Church of Saint Basil of Caesarea, Nor Kesaria, 2011
Surp Anna Church, Aghavnatun, 2012
Surp Karapet Church, Janfida, 2014
Saint Gregory of Narek Cathedral, Armavir, 2014
Holy Mother of God Church, Aratashen, 2015 
Surp Vartan Church, Dalarik, 2015

Inactive/ruined churches and monasteries
Zvartnots Cathedral, Vagharshapat, 652
Targmanchats Monastery, Aygeshat (Vagharshapat), 6-7th centuries

References

External links
Churches of the Armavir Diocese

Armavir
Oriental Orthodox dioceses in Armenia
Armavir Province